The 2013–14 West of Scotland Super League Premier Division was the twelfth Super League Premier Division competition since the formation of the Scottish Junior Football Association, West Region in 2002. The season began on 17 August 2013. The winners of this competition are eligible to enter round one of the 2014–15 Scottish Cup. The two last placed sides were relegated to the Super League First Division. The third-bottom placed side entered the West Region league play-off, a two-legged tie against the third placed side in the Super League First Division, to decide the final promotion/relegation spot.

Auchinleck Talbot won their second successive title on 10 May 2014.

Member clubs for the 2013–14 season
Auchinleck Talbot were the reigning champions.

Hurlford United and Kilbirnie Ladeside were promoted from the Super League First Division, replacing the automatically relegated Beith Juniors and Shotts Bon Accord.

Largs Thistle claimed a third promotion spot after defeating Ashfield in the West Region League play-off.

Managerial changes

League table

Results

West Region League play-off
Shotts Bon Accord, who finished third in the Super League First Division, defeated Kirkintilloch Rob Roy 5 – 2 on aggregate in the West Region League play-off. Shotts will replace Rob Roy in the 2014–15 West of Scotland Super League Premier Division.

References

6
SJFA West Region Premiership seasons